The Aichi H9A (二式練習飛行艇, Navy Type 2 Training Flying Boat) was an Imperial Japanese Navy Air Service flying boat used during the first years of World War II for crew training. An uncommon type, it was not encountered by Allied forces until spring 1945, and was never assigned an Allied reporting name.

Design and development
The H9A was a twin-engined, parasol-wing flying boat, designated by Aichi as their AM-21 design, and was designed in response to an Imperial Japanese Navy requirement for an advanced seaplane trainer for future crew members of the four-engined Kawanishi H8K "Emily" flying boat. Design work started in January 1940 and the first of three prototypes was flown in September 1940. The aircraft had a normal crew of five (pilot, co-pilot, observer, flight engineer and a radio-operator) but seating was provided for an additional three pupil crew members.

Operational history
From May – June 1942, the Aichi H9A was employed in a variety of second-line roles, including anti-submarine missions along the Japanese coasts, transport, paratroop training and liaison.

Variants
H9A Prototypes 3 aircraft built by Aichi.
H9A1 Serial version, 24 aircraft built by Aichi and an additional 4 by Nippon Hikoki.

Operators

Imperial Japanese Navy Air Service

Specifications (H9A1)

See also

References
Notes

Bibliography

 Francillon, Ph.D., René J. Japanese Aircraft of the Pacific War. London: Putnam & Company Ltd., 1979. .
 Green, William. Warplanes of the Second World War, Volume Five: Flying Boats. London: Macdonald & Co. (Publishers) Ltd., 1962 (5th impression 1972). .

External links

 DavesWarbirds.com: Aichi H9A

H9A
H9A, Aichi
Flying boats
Parasol-wing aircraft
Aircraft first flown in 1940
Twin piston-engined tractor aircraft